Guido Giacomelli  (born September 5, 1980) is an Italian ski mountaineer.

Giacomelli was born in Sondalo. He started ski mountaineering in 1995 and competed first in the Pierra Menta race in 1998. He has been member of the national team since 2002. He has held the course record of the Mountain Attack race since 2006 and was member of the Patrouille des Glaciers record team of 2006. Giacomelli enjoys also alpine and cross-country skiing.

Selected results 
 2002:
 1st, World Championship "espoirs" class
 2004:
 2nd, World Championship relay race (together with Carlo Battel, Graziano Boscacci and Martin Riz)
 8th, World Championship team race (together with Mirco Mezzanotte)
 2005:
 1st, European Championship single race
 1st. European Championship relay race (together with Dennis Brunod, Manfred Reichegger and Matteo Pedergnana)
 1st, Tour du Rutor (together with Mirco Mezzanotte)
 2nd, World Cup team (together with Mirco Mezzanotte)
 5th, World Cup race, Salt Lake City
 2006:
 1st, World Championship relay race (together with Hansjörg Lunger, Manfred Reichegger and Dennis Brunod)
 1st, European Cup single
 1st, Adamello Ski Raid (together with Hansjörg Lunger and Mirco Mezzanotte)
 1st, Mountain Attack in Saalbach
 5th, World Championship team race (together with Hansjörg Lunger)
 2007:
 1st: Gara del Pizzo Scalino (together with Daniele Pedrini)
 1st, Dolomiti Cup single
 1st, Mountain Attack
 1st and course record, Sellaronda Skimarathon (together with Hansjörg Lunger)
 1st, Trofeo "Rinaldo Maffeis" (together with Ivan Murada)
 3rd, European Championship team race (together with Jean Pellissier)
 5th, European Championship combination ranking
 9th, European Championship single race
 2008:
 1st, World Championship long distance race
 1st and course record, Sellaronda Skimarathon (together with Hansjörg Lunger)
 1st, Dolomiti Cup team (together with Hansjörg Lunger)
 2nd, World Championship team race (together with Hansjörg Lunger)
 2009:
 2nd, European Championship team race (together with Lorenzo Holzknecht)
 2010:
 1st, Sellaronda Skimarathon (together with Hansjörg Lunger)
 2010:
 1st, Trophée des Gastlosen (ISMF World Cup), together with Denis Trento

Trofeo Mezzalama 

 2003: 4th, together with Camillo Vescovo and Mirco Mezzanotte
 2005: 1st, together with Patrick Blanc and Stéphane Brosse
 2007: 1st, together with Jean Pellissier and Florent Troillet
 2011: 7th, together with Lorenzo Holzknecht and Jean Pellissier

Pierra Menta 

 2005: 3rd, together with Jean Pellissier
 2006: 2nd, together with Hansjörg Lunger
 2007: 2nd, together with Hansjörg Lunger
 2008: 2nd, together with Platz mit Hansjörg Lunger
 2011: 2nd, together with Lorenzo Holzknecht

Patrouille des Glaciers 

 2006: 1st and course record, together with Patrick Blanc and Stéphane Brosse

External links 
 Guido Giacomelli at skimountaineering.org

References 

1980 births
Living people
People from Sondalo
Italian male ski mountaineers
World ski mountaineering champions
Sportspeople from the Province of Sondrio